Events in the year 2016 in Bolivia.

Incumbents
 President: Evo Morales
 Vice President: Álvaro García Linera

Events
21 February – A constitutional referendum results in a majority against allowing president Evo Morales to run for a fourth term.

Sport
Continuing from 2015 – the 2015–16 Liga de Fútbol Profesional Boliviano season
6–14 June – the Bolivia national football team took part in the Copa América Centenario Group D
5–21 August – Bolivia at the 2016 Summer Olympics: 12 competitors in 5 sports
Continuing into 2017 – the 2016–17 Liga de Fútbol Profesional Boliviano season

Deaths

18 January – Armando Loaiza, diplomat and politician (b. 1943).
13 March – Beatriz Canedo Patiño, fashion designer (b. 1950).
17 June – Angel Gelmi Bertocchi, Roman Catholic bishop (b. 1938).
25 August – Rodolfo Illanes, lawyer and politician (b. 1958; murdered)
25 September – David Padilla, military officer and politician (b. 1927)
27 September – Luis Ossio, politician (b. 1930)
5 December – Julia Elena Fortún, historian, anthropologist, folklorist, and ethnomusicologist (b. 1929)

References

 
2010s in Bolivia
Years of the 21st century in Bolivia
Bolivia
Bolivia